An orphan film is a motion picture work that has been abandoned by its owner or copyright holder. The term can also sometimes refer to any film that has suffered neglect.

History
The exact origin of the term orphan film is unclear.  By the 1990s, however, film archivists were commonly using this colloquialism to refer to motion pictures abandoned by their owners.  Before the end of the decade, the phrase emerged as the governing metaphor for film preservation, first in the United States, then internationally.

Definition
Historians and archivists define the term in both a narrow and a broad sense.  A report from the Librarian of Congress, Film Preservation 1993, offered a first definition.  As a category of so-called orphan works, orphan films are those “that lack either clear copyright holders or commercial potential” to pay for their preservation.   However, a much wider group of works fall under the orphan rubric when the term is expanded to refer to all manner of films that have been neglected.  The neglect might be physical (a deteriorated film print), commercial (an unreleased movie), cultural (censored footage), historical (a forgotten World War I-era production) or technical (footage from television commercials and series or music videos).

This broader conception is typically illustrated by a list of orphaned genres.  In Redefining Film Preservation: A National Plan (1994),  the Librarian of Congress enumerated newsreels, actuality footage, silent films, experimental works, home movies, independent fiction and documentary films, political commercials, amateur footage, along with advertising, educational and industrial films as culturally significant orphans.  To this the National Film Preservation Foundation adds animation, ethnic films, anthropological footage, and fragments.  (See "What Are Orphan Films".)

Within a decade the epithet was adopted by scholars and educators.  In The Film Experience:  An Introduction (2004), for example, Timothy Corrigan and Patricia White include a section on orphan films, defining them simply as "Any sort of films that have survived but have no commercial interests to pay the costs of their preservation."

Defined in this way, more films are orphans than not.  Many are more accurately described as “footage,” recordings shot on celluloid but not intended to be completed works or theatrical releases.  The millions of feet of home movies and newsreel outtakes alone outnumber the quantity of film stock used to make all of the feature films ever released by Hollywood studios.

Movement
The resurgent interest in these films is due to their value as cultural and historical artifacts.  Documentarians, filmmakers, historians, curators, collectors and scholars have joined forces with archivists because they deem orphans not only historical documents, but also evidence of alternative, suppressed, minority or forgotten histories.

Since 1999, hundreds of these devotees have gathered for the biennial Orphan Film Symposium. 
In their introduction to the anthology Mining the Home Movie (2008) Karen Ishizuka and Patricia Zimmermann assess the impact of these symposiums:

After the fifth Orphan Film Symposium ("Science, Industry & Education") took place at the University of South Carolina (March 2006), New York University took up the project, incorporating it into the Department of Cinema Studies and its Moving Image Archiving and Preservation master's program at the Tisch School of the Arts. Orphans 6, 7, and 8 took place in New York City. The 2008 symposium focused on neglected films and videos by, about, against, and under "the state." The 2010 edition, "Moving Pictures Around the World," included speakers from 17 nations. In 2012, Museum of the Moving Image in Queens co-hosted the eighth symposium, "Made to Persuade". The ninth and tenth symposiums took place at major institutions outside of New York. EYE Film Institute Netherlands hosted Orphans 9 ("The Future of Obsolescence," 2014) in Amsterdam, attracting attendees from 30 nations. Orphans 10 ("Sound," 2016) convened at the Library of Congress Packard Campus for Audio-Visual Conservation in Culpeper, Virginia.
 
In 2001, members of these academic-archival professions began referring to an “orphan film movement.”  As archivist-scholar Caroline Frick has written, some of the most active participants identify themselves as “orphanistas,” passionate advocates for saving, studying, and screening neglected cinema.  In 2004, visual anthropologist Emily Cohen wrote that the movement's creative and intellectual ferment constituted an “Orphanista Manifesto.”

More pragmatically, in the United States the group's rising influence affected discourse and policies about copyright reform, joining the broader media reform movement. Examples of this include the 2003 Supreme Court case Eldred v. Ashcroft and the 2006 Copyright Office Report on Orphan Works. In September 2008, the U.S. Senate passed a bill (S.2913) "to provide a limitation on judicial remedies in copyright infringement cases involving orphan works," but the House of Representatives adjourned before addressing the measure.

Although U.S. copyright stakeholders confine their discussion to the narrower definition of an orphan (a work with no identifiable rightsholder or whose rights holder cannot be located), the broader conception—an orphan film as a neglected object—continues to be used internationally. Film archivists working quite separately in different nations have used the orphan metaphor for a decade. At the Cinemateca de Cuba, for example, the term "huérfanos" has been used to conceptualize the lost and abandoned works of Cuban film history, its "orfandad."  The Nederlands Filmmuseum preserves and programs its "Bits & Pieces" series of unidentified film fragments, its "foundlings." The China Film Archive in Beijing uses a translatable orphan film metaphor as well.

Another indication of the international interest in orphan films was filmmaker Martin Scorsese's announcement of a World Cinema Foundation (WCF) at the 2007 Cannes Film Festival. Press reports stated that the WCF would preserve "orphan" films. By 2008, however, the WCF's mission statement referred only to "neglected" films rather than orphans, as the foundation helps fund preservation of lesser known theatrical motion pictures, which remain under the legal ownership of some party. World Cinema Foundation In 2013 the foundation proper was renamed the World Cinema Project, which is overseen by The Film Foundation Scorsese created in 1990.

In April 2008, the International Federation of Film Archives (FIAF) endorsed a "Declaration on Fair Use and Access" which stated "FIAF supports efforts to clarify the legal status of 'orphan' motion pictures and related promotional and historical materials for the purpose of preservation and public access."  Shortly thereafter, on June 4, 2008, the European Union announced the signing of a new "Memorandum of Understanding" on orphan works. The EU's Digital Libraries Initiative produced the statement.  Signatories included key institutions in moving image archiving and representatives of rightsholders: Association Des Cinematheques Europeennes - Association of European Film Archives and Cinematheques, the British Library, European Film Companies Alliance, Federation Europeenne Des Realisateurs De L'audiovisuel, Federation Internationale Des Associations De Producteurs De Films, and the International Federation Of Film Distributors. In 2010, the Association of European Film Archives and Cinematheques carried out a survey among its members to assess the dimension of orphan films. According to this survey, more than 210,000 films preserved in Europe's Film Archives are considered orphan.
In October 2012, the EU adopted the Orphan Works Directive 2012/28/EU which legally allows the (online) use of orphan works across Europe, provided that a search for the rights holder has been carried before. 
Currently, the European Union is addressing copyright, access, and preservation issues via FORWARD, a three-year project (2013-2016) to create a registry of orphan films. Officially termed  "Framework for a EU-wide Audiovisual Orphan Works Registry," the project aims to create simplified process for determining the rights status of moving image works. See Project-FORWARD.eu.

See also
Orphan works
Film preservation
Association of Moving Image Archivists
The Texas Archive of the Moving Image
Alan Smithee
Abandonware

References

Footnotes

Bibliography

Asch, Mark. "Three Questions for Cullen Gallagher About the Orphan Film Symposium," The L Magazine, January 22, 2010.
Boyle, James, et al.  Access to Orphan Films,  submission to the Copyright Office, from the Center for the Study of the Public Domain, Duke University Law School, March 2005. 
 
Cherchi Usai, Paolo.  "What Is an Orphan Film?  Definition, Rationale, Controversy."  Paper delivered at the symposium "Orphans of the Storm:  Saving Orphan Films in the Digital Age", University of South Carolina, September 23, 1999.  Transcript at http://www.sc.edu/filmsymposium/archive/orphans2001/usai.html 
 
 
 
Cullum, Paul. “Orphanistas! Academics and Amateurs Unite to Save the Orphan Film,” L.A. Weekly, Apr. 26, 2001.
de Klerk, Nico. "Entwurf eines Heims. 'Orphan Films' im Werk Gustav Deutsch / Designing a Home: Orphan Films in the Work of Gustav Deutsch." In Gustav Deutsch, ed. Wilbirg Brainin-Donnenberg and Michael Loebenstein (Vienna: SYNEMA, 2009): 113–22.
Fishman, Stephen.  The Public Domain: How to Find & Use Copyright-free Writing, Music, Art, & More, 3rd ed.  Berkeley, CA: Nolo, 2006.
 
Frick, Caroline. 'Saving Cinema: The Politics of Preservation' (Oxford University Press, 2010).
Goldsmith, Leo. "Adventures in Preservation: A Report from the 7th Orphan Film Symposium," Moving Image Source, June 10, 2010.
 
 
Jones, Janna. The Past Is a Moving Picture: Preserving the Twentieth Century on Film. Gainesville: University Press of Florida, 2012. See chapter 3, subtitled "Orphans and the Culture Wars."
 
Libby, Jenn.  "Foundling Films: Orphans 5: Science, Industry and Education", Afterimage (May/June 2006): 11.  
 
 
Musser, Charles. Foreword to Fight Pictures: A History of Boxing and Early Cinema by Dan Streible (University of California Press, 2008), x–xvi.
“Orphans No More: Ephemeral Films and American Culture,” issue of the Journal of Popular Film and Television 37 (Fall 2009), ed. Elizabeth Heffelfinger and Heide Solbrig.
 
“‘Orphan Films’ Course to Screen Eight Neglected Works at Guild,” Los Angeles Times, Nov. 23, 1979.
Orphan Works and Mass Digitization: Obstacles and Opportunities, Berkeley Technology Law Journal 27.3 (2012): 1251-1550. 
Prelinger, Rick.  The Field Guide to Sponsored Films.  San Francisco:  National Film Preservation Foundation, 2006. 
Prelinger, Rick. "On the Virtues of Preexisting Material," Black Oyster Catcher, blog, May 30, 2007. Republished as "Prelinger Manifesto: On the Virtues of Preexisting Material," Enclosure of the Commons blog Feb. 23, 2010; and in Contents magazine no. 5 (2013). 
Prelinger, Rick, with Raegan Kelly.  “Panorama Ephemera,”  Vectors: Journal of Culture and Technology in a Dynamic Vernacular, vol. 2.
Ruffino, Paul. “Orphan Films: Neglecting Festival Jewels - The Forgotten Films,” OC Film Commission, Feb. 2012  www.orphanfilms.org
 
 
 
Streible, Dan. “Saving, Studying, and Screening: A History of the Orphan Film Symposium.” In Film Festival Yearbook 5: Archival Film Festivals. Edited by Alex Marlow-Mann (St. Andrews, UK: St. Andrews Film Studies, 2013), 163–76. 
 
Tynes, Teri. "*Gustav Deutsch and the Art of Found Footage.” Originally for Reframe (Tribeca Film Institute blog), May 6, 2009. footage.html Access via the filmmaker’s website.
 
Wilson, Rachel. "Moving Pictures Around the World: The 7th Orphan Film Symposium," Senses of Cinema, 55 (2010). 
Ziebell Mann, Sarah.  “A Meditation on the Orphan, via the University of South Carolina Symposium,” AMIA Newsletter 47 (Winter 2000), 30, 33.

External links 

Orphan Film Symposium websites at New York University (Cinema Studies Dept., Tisch School of the Arts),  and at the University of South Carolina (Film and Media Studies Program, College of Arts & Sciences), including "What is an orphan film?"  http://www.sc.edu/filmsymposium/orphanfilm.html. These sites include audio and video recordings of talks given at the symposia.
Orphan Film Symposium Collection, Internet Archive. Created May 3, 2010; last updated July 4, 2022. Audiovisual documentation generated at the Orphan Film Symposium and miscellaneous short orphan films and videos.
National Film Preservation Foundation
 Orphan Works Website of the Association of European Film Archives and Cinematheques 
FORWARD project website
Orphaned Entertainment Podcast - Reviews public domain and orphaned films - https://www.orphanedentertainment.com

Film preservation
Orphan works
Articles containing video clips